Since the publication of the Book of Mormon in 1830, Mormon archaeologists have attempted to find archaeological evidence to support it.  Although historians and archaeologists consider the book to be an anachronistic invention of Joseph Smith, many members of the Church of Jesus Christ of Latter-day Saints (LDS Church) and other denominations of the Latter Day Saint movement believe that it describes ancient historical events in the Americas.

The Book of Mormon principally describes God's dealings with two civilizations in the Americas over the course of several hundred years. The book primarily deals with the Nephites and the Lamanites, who – it states – existed in the Americas from about 600 BC to about AD 400. It also deals with the rise and fall of the Jaredite nation, which the Book of Mormon says came from the Old World shortly after the confounding of the languages at the Tower of Babel. The Book of Mormon mentions several animals, plants, and technologies that are not substantiated by the archaeological record of the period 3100 BC to 400 AD in the Americas, constituting some of the most significant anachronisms in the Book of Mormon.

Some early-20th century Mormons claimed various archaeological findings such as place names, and ruins of the Inca, Maya, Olmec, and other ancient American and Old World civilizations as giving credence to the Book of Mormon record. Many current believers, including the LDS Church, have no strong position on whether or how to attribute the people in the narrative to specific groups.

Archaeology research in pre-Columbian Americas and the Book of Mormon
Numerous observers have suggested that the Book of Mormon appears to be a work of fiction that parallels others within the 19th-century "Mound Builder" genre that was pervasive at the time. Some nineteenth-century archaeological finds (e.g., earth and timber fortifications and towns, the use of a plaster-like cement, ancient roads, metal points and implements,  copper breastplates, head-plates, textiles, pearls, native North American inscriptions, North American elephant remains etc.) were well-publicized at the time of the publication of the Book of Mormon and there is incorporation of some of these ideas into the narrative. References are made in the Book of Mormon to then-current understanding of pre-Columbian civilizations, including the Formative Mesoamerican civilizations such as the (Pre-Classic) Olmec, Maya, and Zapotec.

Organizational statements regarding the Book of Mormon

Smithsonian Institution
During the early 1980s, rumors circulated in Mormon culture that the Book of Mormon was being used by the Smithsonian Institution to guide primary archaeological research. These rumors were brought to the attention of Smithsonian directors who, by 1982, sent a form letter to inquiring parties stating that the Smithsonian did not use the Book of Mormon to guide any research, and included a list of specific reasons Smithsonian archaeologists considered the Book of Mormon historically unlikely. In 1998, the Smithsonian revised the form letter and stated that Book of Mormon had not been used by the Smithsonian in any form of archaeological research. Mormon scholars speculated that this was because the earlier version of the letter contradicts some aspects of research published by Smithsonian staff members. Non-Mormon scholars note that the Smithsonian has not retracted any of its previous statements and feel that the response was toned down to avoid negative public relations with Mormons. Terryl Givens speculates that the change in the statement was an effort to avoid controversy.

National Geographic Society
The Institute for Religious Research posted on their website a 1998 letter from National Geographic Society that stated that they were unaware of any archaeological evidence that would support the Book of Mormon. It is no longer posted on their website.

Anachronisms and archaeological findings

Critics of the Book of Mormon have argued that there are words and phrases in the book that are anachronistic with archaeological findings. These relate to artifacts, animal, plant, or technology that critics believe did not exist in the Americas during the Book of Mormon time period (before 2500 BC to about 400 AD). The list below summarizes a few of the anachronistic criticisms in the Book of Mormon, as well as perspectives and rebuttals by Mormon apologists.

There are five incidences where horses are mentioned in the Book of Mormon, and are portrayed as being in the forest upon first arrival of the Nephites, "raise(d)", "fed", "prepared" (in conjunction with chariots), used for food, and being "useful unto man".  Horses in the America are considered to have become extinct between 10,000 and 7,600 years ago, and did not reappear there until the Spaniards brought them from Europe. Horses were re-introduced to the Americas (Caribbean) by Christopher Columbus in 1493 and to the American continent by Cortés in 1519. Mormon archaeologist John L. Sorenson claims that there is fossil evidence that some New World horses may have survived the Pleistocene–Holocene transition, though these findings are disputed by other Book of Mormon scholars. Alternately, Mormon apologist Robert R. Bennett suggests that the word "horse" in the Book of Mormon may have referred to a different animal, such as a tapir.

Elephants are mentioned once in the earliest Book of Mormon record around 2500 BC in the Book of Ether. Critics argue that the archaeological record suggests that all elephant-like creatures became extinct in the New World around 10,000 BC. The source of this extinction is speculated to be the result of human predation, a significant climate change, or a combination of both factors. Recent eDNA research of sediments indicates mammoths survived until at least 6600 BC in North America. A small population of mammoths survived on St. Paul Island, Alaska, up until 3700 BC,

Apologists deal with the "elephant" in much the same way as they treat the "horse" anachronism, countering with the following arguments:
Various amateur archaeologists and Mormon authors have cited controversial evidence that North American mound builder cultures were familiar with the elephant. This evidence has long been a topic of debate with modern archaeologists concluding that the elephantine remains were improperly dated, misidentified, or openly fraudulent.

Cattle and cows

There are five separate incidences of "cows" or "cattle" in the New World in the Book of Mormon, including verbiage that they were "raise(d)" and were "for the use of man" or "useful for the food of man", and indicates that "cattle" and "cows" were not considered the same animal. While the Book of Mormon may follow the common biblical precedent of referring to all domesticated animals as "cattle", there is no evidence that Old World cattle (members of the genus Bos) inhabited the New World prior to European contact in the 16th century AD. Further, there is currently no archaeological evidence of American bison having been domesticated. It is widely accepted that the only large mammals to be domesticated in the Americas were the llama and the alpaca and that no species of goats, deer, or sheep were fully domesticated before the arrival of the Europeans to the continent.

Some Mormon apologists believe that the term "cattle", as used in the Book of Mormon is more general and does not exclusively mean members of the genus Bos. Thus, they claim the term "cattle" may refer to mountain goats; llamas; or the ancestor of the American bison, Bison antiquus (of the sub family Bovinae).

Sheep
"Sheep" are mentioned in the Book of Mormon metaphorically at various places in the Nephite record but are conspicuously absent in the list of animals observed in the New World upon the arrival of the Nephites. In one instance sheep are described as being possessed by the Jaredites in the Americas at approximately 2300 BC. Another verse mentions "lamb-skin" worn by enemy armies of robbers about their loins (circa 21 AD). However, domesticated sheep are known to have been first introduced to the Americas during the second voyage of Columbus in 1493.

Mormon apologists argue the following to deal with this anachronism:
One apologist cites the discovery of some charred wool cloth in a grave during a dig in central Mexico in 1935. However, the discovering archeologists noted their uncertainty in determining if the grave was pre-Spanish.
Some suggest that the word "sheep" may refer to another species of animal that resembled sheep such as big horn sheep or llamas. Critics point out that big horn sheep have never been domesticated by humans. Llamas and Alpacas are native to the Andes in South America. 
The sheep referred to by the Jaredites, as the reference is not long after their arrival around 2500 BC, is referring to Old World sheep as it is mentioned in the Book of Mormon that the Jaredites brought animals and birds with them, and the reference to lamb-skins may refer to wild sheep that were hunted. No evidence of domesticated sheep has been found in the Americas prior to Columbus.

Goats

"Goats" are mentioned three times in the Book of Mormon placing them among the Nephites and the Jaredites (i.e., between 2500 BC and 400 AD). In two of the verses, "goats" are distinguished from "wild goats", indicating that there were at least two varieties, one of them possibly domesticated.

Domesticated goats are known to have been introduced on the American continent by Europeans in the 15th century, 1000 years after the conclusion of the Book of Mormon, and nearly 2000 years after goats are last mentioned in the Book of Mormon. The aggressive mountain goat is indigenous to North America. There is no evidence that it was ever domesticated. Mormon Apologist Matthew Roper has countered these claims, pointing out that 16th-century Spanish friars used the word "goat" to refer to native Mesoamerican brocket deer. There is no evidence that brocket deer were ever domesticated.

Swine

"Swine" are referred to twice in the Book of Mormon, and states that the swine were "useful for the food of man" among the Jaredites. There have not been any remains, references, artwork, tools, or any other evidence suggesting that swine were ever present in the pre-Columbian New World.

Apologists note that peccaries (also known as javelinas), which bear a superficial resemblance to pigs and are in the same subfamily Suinae as swine, have been present in South America since prehistoric times. Mormon authors advocating the original mound-builder setting for the Book of Mormon have similarly suggested North American peccaries (also called "wild pigs") as the "swine" of the Jaredites. The earliest scientific description of peccaries in the New World in Brazil in 1547 referred to them as "wild pigs".

Though it has not been documented that peccaries were bred in captivity, it has been documented that peccaries were tamed, penned, and raised for food and ritual purposes in the Yucatán, Panama, the southern Caribbean, and Columbia at the time of the Conquest. Archaeological remains of peccaries have been found in Mesoamerica from the Preclassic (or Formative) period up until immediately before Spanish contact. Specifically, peccary remains have been found at Early Formative Olmec civilization sites, which civilization Mormon apologists correlate to the Book of Mormon Jaredites.

Barley and wheat

"Barley" is mentioned three times and "wheat" once in the Book of Mormon narrative with the ground being "tilled" to plant barley and wheat at one geographical location, in the 1st and 2nd century BC according to Book of Mormon chronology. The introduction of domesticated modern barley and wheat to the New World was made by Europeans after 1492. The Book of Mormon claims that non-specific "seeds" were brought from the land of Jerusalem and planted on arrival in the New World and produced a successful yield. To date, the existing evidence suggests that the introduction of Old World flora and fauna to the American continent happened during the Columbian exchange.

FARMS scholar Robert Bennett argues the following to deal with this anachronism:
That the words "barley" and "wheat" in the Book of Mormon may actually be referring to other crops in the Americas, such as Hordeum pusillum. Most Hordeum pusillum has been found in Iowa, dating back to around 2,500 years ago.
That these words may refer to genuine varieties of New World barley and wheat, which are as yet undiscovered in the archaeological record.
That the Norse, after reaching North America, claimed to have found what they called "self-sown wheat".

Bennett states:
Research on this matter supports two possible explanations. First, the terms barley and wheat, as used in the Book of Mormon, may refer to certain other New World crop plants that were given Old World designations; and second, the terms may refer to genuine varieties of New World barley and wheat. For example, the Spanish called the fruit of the prickly pear cactus a "fig," and emigrants from England called maize "corn," an English term referring to grains in general. A similar practice may have been employed when Book of Mormon people encountered New World plant species for the first time.

Bennett describes the use of Hordeum pusillum, also known as "little barley", a species of grass native to the Americas. The seeds are edible, and this plant was part of the pre-Columbian Eastern Agricultural Complex of cultivated plants used by Native Americans. Hordeum pusillum was unknown in Mesoamerica, where there is no evidence of pre-Columbian barley cultivation. Evidence exists that this plant was domesticated in North America in the Woodland periods contemporary with mound-builder societies (early centuries AD) and has been carbon-dated to 2,500 years ago. Barley samples that date to 900 AD were also found in Phoenix, Arizona, and samples from Southern Illinois date between 1 and 900 AD.

Silk

The Book of Mormon mentions the use of "silk" in the New World four times. "Silk" ordinarily refers to material that is created from the cocoon of one of several Asian moths, predominantly Bombyx mori; this type of silk was unknown in pre-Columbian America.

Mormon scholar John L. Sorenson documents several materials which were used in Mesoamerica to make fine cloth equivalent to silk, some of which the Spanish actually called "silk" upon their arrival, including the fiber (kapok) from the seed pods of the ceiba tree, the cocoons of wild moths, the fibers of silkgrass (Achmea magdalenae), the leaves of the wild pineapple plant, and the fine hair of the underbelly of rabbits. He alleges that the inhabitants of Mexico used the fiber spun by a wild silkworm to create a fabric.

The Aztecs used a silk material taken from nests made by two indigenous insects, the moth Eucheira socialis and the butterfly Gloveria psidii.  The nests were cut and pieced together to make a fabric, rather than extracting and spinning the fiber as in modern silk.  Spinning of silk from what are thought to be the same insects has been reported in more recent times, though its use in pre-Columbian times has been debated.

Old World artifacts and products

Chariots or wheeled vehicles

The Book of Mormon contains two accounts of "chariots" being used in the New World.

Critics argue that there is no archaeological evidence to support the use of wheeled vehicles in Mesoamerica, especially since many parts of ancient Mesoamerica were not suitable for wheeled transport. Clark Wissler, the Curator of Ethnography at the American Museum of Natural History in New York City, noted: "we see that the prevailing mode of land transport in the New World was by human carrier. The wheel was unknown in pre-Columbian times."

A comparison of the South American Inca civilization to Mesoamerican civilizations shows the same lack of wheeled vehicles. Although the Incas used a vast network of paved roads, these roads are so rough, steep, and narrow that they appear to be unsuitable for wheeled use. Bridges that the Inca people built, and even continue to use and maintain today in some remote areas, are straw-rope bridges so narrow (about 2–3 feet wide) that no wheeled vehicle can fit. Inca roads were used mainly by chaski message runners and llama caravans.

Some Mormon apologists argue the following to deal with this anachronism:
One apologist has suggested that the "chariots" mentioned in the Book of Mormon might refer to mythic or cultic wheeled vehicles.
Some apologists point out that pre-Columbian wheeled toys have been found in Mesoamerica, indicating that the wheel was known by ancient American peoples. Some of these wheeled toys were referred to by Smithsonian archaeologist William Henry Holmes and archaeologist Désiré Charnay as "chariots".
One Mormon apologist argues that few chariot fragments have been found in the Middle East dating to Biblical times (apart from the disassembled chariots found in Tutankhamun's tomb), and therefore wheeled chariots did exist in the Book of Mormon timeframe and it would not be unreasonable to assume that archaeologists have not yet discovered any evidence of them.
Critics counter that although few fragments of chariots have been found in the Middle East, there are many images of ancient chariots on pottery and frescoes and in many sculptures of Mediterranean origin, thus confirming their existence in those societies. The absence of these images among pre-Columbian artwork found in the New World (with the exception of Pre-Columbian wheeled toys), they state, does not support the existence of Old World–style chariots in the New World.
Mormon scholar Brant Gardner has asserted that the Book of Mormon "chariot' may be a palanquin or litter vehicle, and apologist Michael Ash generally speculates that the word "chariot" may refer to a non-wheeled vehicle.

Iron and steel

"Steel" and "iron" are mentioned several times in the Book of Mormon. Ancient mound-building cultures of North America are known to have mined and worked native copper, silver, gold, and meteoric iron, although evidence of iron being hardened to make steel in ancient times has not been found in the Americas.

Between 2004 and 2007, a Purdue University archaeologist, Kevin J. Vaughn, discovered a 2000-year-old hematite mine near Nazca, Peru. Although hematite is today mined as an iron ore, Vaughn believes that the hematite was then being mined for use as red pigment. There are also numerous excavations that included iron minerals. He noted:

Even though ancient Andean people smelted some metals, such as copper, they never smelted iron like they did in the Old World .... Metals were used for a variety of tools in the Old World, such as weapons, while in the Americas, metals were used as prestige goods for the wealthy elite.

Apologists counter that the word "steel" in the Book of Mormon likely refers to a hardened metal other than iron. This argument follows from the fact that the Book of Mormon refers to certain Old World articles made of "steel". Similar "steel" articles mentioned in the King James Version of the Bible (KJV) are actually hardened copper. It has been demonstrated that much of the terminology of the Book of Mormon parallels the language of the KJV. Ancient mound-building cultures of North America are known to have mined and worked native copper, silver, gold, and meteoric iron, although few instances of metallic blades or of deliberately alloyed (or "hardened") copper have been uncovered from ancient North America. Examples of ancient copper knife blades have been found on Isle Royale and around Lake Superior.

Metal swords, which had "rusted"
The Book of Mormon makes numerous references to "swords" and their use in battle. When the remnants of the Jaredites' final battle were discovered, the Book of Mormon narrative states that some swords were collected and "the hilts thereof have perished, and the blades thereof were cankered with rust."

Apologists argue that most references to swords do not speak of the material they were made of, and that they may refer to a number of weapons such as the macuahuitl, a "sword" made of obsidian blades that was used by the Aztecs. It was very sharp and could decapitate a man or horse.

Cimeters
"Cimeters" are mentioned in eight instances in the Book of Mormon stretching from approximately 500 BC to 51 BC. Critics argue this existed hundreds of years before the term "scimitar" was coined. The word "cimiter" is considered an anachronism since the word was never used by the Hebrews (from which the Book of Mormon peoples came) or any other civilization prior to 450 AD. The word 'cimeterre' is found in the 1661 English dictionary Glossographia and is defined as "a crooked sword" and was part of the English language at the time that the Book of Mormon was translated. In the 7th century, scimitars generally first appeared among the Turko- Mongol nomads of Central Asia however a notable exception was the sickle sword of ancient Egypt known as the khopesh which was used from 3000 BC and is found on the Rosetta Stone dated to 196 BC. Eannatum, the king of Lagash, is shown on a Sumerian stele from 2500 BC equipped with a sickle sword.

Apologists Michael R. Ash and William Hamblin postulate that the word was chosen by Joseph Smith as the closest workable English word for a short curved weapon used by the Nephites.
Mormon scholar Matthew Roper has noted there are a variety of weapons with curved blades found in Mesoamerica.

System of exchange based on measures of grain using precious metals as a standard
The Book of Mormon details a system of measures used by the societies described therein. However, the overall use of metal in ancient America seems to have been extremely limited. A more common exchange medium in Mesoamerica were cacao beans.

Knowledge of Hebrew and Egyptian languages

 The Book of Mormon describes more than one literate people inhabiting ancient America. The Nephite people are described as possessing a language and writing with roots in Hebrew and Egyptian, and writing part of the original text of the Book of Mormon in this unknown language, called reformed Egyptian. A transcript of some of the characters of this language has been preserved in what had previously been erroneously identified as the "Anthon Transcript" but is now known as the "Caractors document".

Fifteen examples of distinct scripts have been identified in pre-Columbian Mesoamerica, many from a single inscription. While Maya contains cartouches and is a form of hieroglyphic script like Egyptian, no further resemblance to Hebrew or Egyptian hieroglyphs has been identified. Additionally, professional linguists and Egyptologists do not consider the Caractors document to contain any legitimate ancient writing. Edward H. Ashment called the characters of the transcript "hieroglyphics of the Micmac Indians of northeastern North America".

The Smithsonian Institution has noted, "Reports of findings of ancient Egyptian Hebrew, and other Old World writings in the New World in pre-Columbian contexts have frequently appeared in newspapers, magazines, and sensational books. None of these claims has stood up to examination by reputable scholars. No inscriptions using Old World forms of writing have been shown to have occurred in any part of the Americas before 1492 except for a few Norse rune stones which have been found in Greenland."

Linguistic studies on the evolution of the spoken languages of the Americas agree with the widely held model that Homo sapiens arrived in America between 15,000 and 10,000 BC. According to the Book of Mormon, additional immigrants arrived on the American continent about 2500 BC and about 600 BC.

Systems of measuring time (calendars)
Chronologic dates given in the Nephite portion of the Book of Mormon are stated in terms of the Nephite calendar. The Jaredite abridgment does not contain an apparent calendar, the length of reigns and ages of kings are indicated in years, but no connection beyond that to a continuous calendar is indicated. The system of dates used by the Lamanites is not stated, though the Book of Mormon indicates that Lamanites had a different system of counting hours. The highest numbered month mentioned in the Book of Mormon is the eleventh, and the highest numbered day is the twelfth, but the total number of months in a year and the number of days in a month is not explicitly stated. Even so, it appears that Book of Mormon peoples observed lunar cycles, "months", and that the Nephites observed the Israelite Sabbath at the end of a seven-day week.

Most North American tribes relied upon a calendar of 13 months, relating to the annual number of lunar cycles. Seasonal rounds and ceremonies were performed each moon. Months were counted in the days between phase cycles of the moon. Calendar systems in use in North America during this historical period relied on this simple system.<ref>13 Moons On the Turtles Back. A Native American Year of Moons, Putnam and Grossnet Group, 199</ref>

One of the more distinctive features shared among pre-Columbian Mesoamerican civilizations is the use of an extensive system of inter-related calendars. The epigraphic and archaeological record for this practice dates back at least 2,500 years, by which time it appears to have been well-established. The most widespread and significant of these calendars was the 260-day calendar, formed by combining 20 named days with 13 numerals in successive sequence (13 × 20 = 260). Another system of perhaps equal antiquity is the 365-day calendar, approximating the solar year, formed from 18 "months" × 20 named days + 5 additional days. These systems and others are found in societies of that era such as the Olmec, Zapotec, Mixe-Zoque, Mixtec, and Maya (whose system of Maya calendars are widely regarded as the most intricate and complex among them) reflected the vigesimal (base 20) numeral system and other numbers, such as 7, 9, 13, and 19.

Latter-day Saints and Book of Mormon archaeology

Early activities
In the early 1840s, John Lloyd Stephens' two-volume work Incidents of Travel in Central America, Chiapas, and Yucatan was seen by some church members as an essential guide to the ruins of Book of Mormon cities. In the fall of 1842, an article appearing in the church's Times and Seasons alleged that the ruins of Quiriguá, discovered by Stephens, may be the very ruins of Zarahemla or some other Book of Mormon city. Other articles followed, including one published shortly after the death of Joseph Smith. Every Latter Day Saint was encouraged to read Stephens' book and to regard the stone ruins described in it as relating to the Book of Mormon. It is now believed that these Central American ruins date more recent than Book of Mormon times.

In recent years, there have been differing views among Book of Mormon scholars, particularly between the scholars and the "hobbyists".

New World Archaeological Foundation
From the mid-1950s onwards, New World Archaeological Foundation (NWAF), based out of Brigham Young University, has sponsored archaeological excavations in Mesoamerica, with a focus on the Mesoamerican time period known as the Preclassic (earlier than c. AD 200). The results of these and other investigations, while producing valuable archaeological data, have not led to any widespread acceptance by non-Mormon archaeologists of the Book of Mormon account. In 1973, citing the lack of specific New World geographic locations to search, Michael D. Coe, a prominent Mesoamerican archaeologist and Professor Emeritus of Anthropology at Yale University, wrote,

As far as I know there is not one professionally trained archaeologist, who is not a Mormon, who sees any scientific justification for believing the historicity of the Book of Mormon, and I would like to state that there are quite a few Mormon archaeologists who join this group.

In 1955, Thomas Stuart Ferguson, an attorney and the founder of the NWAF, received five years of funding from the LDS Church and the NWAF then began to dig throughout Mesoamerica for evidence of the veracity of the Book of Mormon claims. In a 1961 newsletter, Ferguson predicted that although nothing had been found, the Book of Mormon cities would be found within 10 years. The NWAF became part of BYU in 1961 and Ferguson was removed from the director position.

Eleven years after Ferguson was no longer affiliated with the NWAF, in 1972 Christian scholar Hal Hougey wrote Ferguson questioning the progress given the stated timetable in which the cities would be found. Replying to Hougey, as well as other secular and non-secular requests, Ferguson wrote in a letter dated 5 June 1972: "Ten years have passed .... I had sincerely hoped that Book-of-Mormon cities would be positively identified within 10 years—and time has proved me wrong in my anticipation."

In 1976, fifteen years removed from any archaeological involvement with the NWAF, referring to his own paper, Ferguson wrote a letter in which he stated:

The real implication of the paper is that you can't set the Book-of-Mormon geography down anywhere—because it is fictional and will never meet the requirements of the dirt-archeology. I should say—what is in the ground will never conform to what is in the book.

Archaeological efforts have failed to garner complete support from all prominent Mormon scholars. Author and Mormon Professor of Biblical and Mormon scripture Hugh Nibley published the following critical remarks:

Book of Mormon archaeologists have often been disappointed in the past because they have consistently looked for the wrong things ... Blinded by the gold of the pharaohs and the mighty ruins of Babylon, Book of Mormon students have declared themselves "not interested" in the drab and commonplace remains of our lowly Indians. But in all the Book of Mormon we look in vain for anything that promises majestic ruins.

Though the NWAF failed to establish a common belief of a specific Book of Mormon geographic location, the archaeological investigations of NWAF-sponsored projects were a success for ancient American archaeology in general which has been recognized and appreciated by non-Mormon archaeologists. Currently BYU maintains 86 documents on the work of the NWAF at the BYU NWAF website; these documents are used outside both BYU and the LDS Church by researchers.

Modern approach and conclusions
There is a broad consensus among archaeologists that the archaeological record does not substantiate the Book of Mormon account, and in most ways directly contradicts it.

An example of the mainstream archaeological opinion of Mormon archaeology is summarized by historian and journalist Hampton Sides:

Yale's Michael Coe likes to talk about what he calls "the fallacy of misplaced concreteness," the tendency among Mormon theorists like Sorenson to keep the discussion trained on all sorts of extraneous subtopics ... while avoiding what is most obvious: that Joseph Smith probably meant "horse" when he wrote down the word "horse".

Old World Mormon archaeology
Some Mormon archaeologists and researchers have focused on the Arabian peninsula in the Middle East where they believe the Book of Mormon narrative describes actual locations. These alleged connections include the following:
One Mormon apologist believes that an ancient tribe known to have existed on the Arabian Peninsula with a similar name to that of the Book of Mormon figure Lehi may have adopted his name. Other Mormon scholars have not reached this conclusion, as "far too little is yet known about early Arabia to strengthen a link with the historical Lehi, and other explanations are readily available for every point advanced."
The Wadi Tayyib al-Ism is considered to be a plausible location for the Book of Mormon River of Laman by some Mormon researchers. This is disputed by other Mormon researchers.
Some Mormon theorist believe that the Book of Mormon place name "Nahom" correlates to a location in Yemen referred to as "NHM". According to Jerald and Sandra Tanner this link is disputed by mainstream archaeologists.
Mormon scholars believe they have located several plausible sites for the Book of Mormon location "Bountiful".
One Mormon apologist believes that an ancient Judean artifact is connected with the Book of Mormon figure Mulek.
Several Mormon apologists have proposed a variety of locations on the Arabian Peninsula that they believe could be the Book of Mormon location "Shazer".

New World Mormon archaeology

Archaeological studies in the New World that tie Book of Mormon places and peoples to real world locations and civilizations are incredibly difficult since there are generally no landmarks defined in the Book of Mormon that can unambiguously identify real world locations. Generally non-Mormon archaeologists do not consider there to be any authentic Book of Mormon archaeological sites. Various apologists have claimed that events in the Book of Mormon took place in a variety of locations including North America, South America, Central America, and even the Malay Peninsula. These finds are divided into competing models, most notably the Hemispheric Geography Model, the Mesoamerican Limited Geography Model, and the Finger Lakes Limited Geography Model.

Hemispheric Geography Model
The Hemispheric Geography Model posits that the events of the Book of Mormon took place over the entirety of the North and South American continents. By corollary some Mormons believe that the three groups mentioned in the Book of Mormon (Jaredites, Nephites, and Lamanites) exclusively populated an empty North and South American Continent, and that Native Americans were all of Israeli descent.

Speculations from various church leaders has shifted slightly over time, with early Mormon leaders including Orson Pratt taking a traditional stance.Silverberg quotes early Mormon Apostle Orson Pratt who attempted to incorporate "ancient mounds filled with human bones" in a geographic model spanning "North and South America." (Silverberg, Robert, The Mound Builders, pg. 73)Orson Pratt also speculated that the Nephite landing site was on the coast of Chile near Valparaiso, Orson Pratt, Journal of Discourses (London, England: Albert Carrington, 1869), vol. 12; p. 342; Volume 14, p. 325, 1872. This model was also implicitly endorsed in the introduction to the Book of Mormon which, before 2008, stated that Lamanites are the "principal ancestors of the American Indians." More recently, the church has not taken as strong position on the absolute origin of Native American peoples.

Some Mormon apologists note that on June 4, 1834, during the Zion's Camp trek through Illinois, Joseph Smith stated that the group was "wandering over the plains of the Nephites, recounting occasionally the history of the Book of Mormon, roving over the mounds of that once beloved people of the Lord, picking up their skulls & their bones, as proof of its divine authenticity".

Criticism of the Hemispheric Model
Critics have noted that the assumption that Lamanites are the ancestors of the American Indians is wholly unfounded in current archaeological and genetic research.

Mesoamerican Limited Geography Model

The Mesoamerican Limited Geography Model posits that the events of the Book of Mormon occurred in a geographically "limited" region in Mesoamerica only hundreds of miles in dimension and that other people were present in the New World at the time of Lehi's arrival. This model has been proposed and advocated by various Mormon apologists in the 20th century (both RLDS and LDS). Geographically limited settings for the Book of Mormon have been suggested by LDS church leaders as well, and this view has been published in the official church magazine, Ensign.

Mormon apologists believe the following archaeological evidence supports the Mesoamerican Geography Model:
Some Mormon apologists argue that there is only a single plausible match with the geography in Mesoamerica centered around the Isthmus of Tehuantepec (current day Guatemala, the southern Mexico States of Tabasco, Chiapas, Oaxaca, Veracruz, and the surrounding area). This region was first proposed as the location of Zarahemla (ruins of Quirigua) in the anonymous newspaper article of October 1, 1842 (Times and Seasons).
Mormon apologist John L. Sorenson cites discoveries of fortifications at Becán, Tlaxcala, Puebla, Teotihuacan, and Kaminaljuyu, dated between 100 and 300 AD, as evidence of the Book of Mormon's account of large-scale warfare.
Some apologists, and church leaders (including Joseph Smith) believe that the Maya ruins on the Yucatán Peninsula belonged to Book of Mormon peoples LDS efforts to relate anachronistic Mayan ruins to Book of Mormon cities, owes much of its origins to an infatuation with archaeologists Stephens' and Catherwood's discoveries of Mesoamerican ruins, made public more than a decade after the first publication of the Book of Mormon. These findings were cited by early church leaders and publications as confirming evidence. This correlation is clearly problematic however, since conventional archaeology places the pinnacle of Mayan civilization several centuries after the final events in the Book of Mormon supposedly occurred. Copan, Quirigua, and sites in the Yucatàn visited by Stephens and Catherwood, contain artifacts that date more recent than Book of Mormon times. It has not been shown that any of Stephens' artifacts date to Book of Mormon times.

Criticism of the Mesoamerican Geography Model
The Limited Mesoamerican Geography Model has been critiqued by a number of scholars, who suggest that it is not an adequate explanation for Book of Mormon geography and that the locations, events, flora and fauna described in it do not precisely match. In response to one of these critiques in 1994, Sorenson reaffirmed his support for a limited Mesoamerican geographical setting.
Among apologists, there have been critiques—particularly around the location of the Hill Cumorah, which most Mormons consider to be definitively identified as a location in New York. In a Mesoamerican Limited Geography model, this would require there to be two Cumorahs (which some consider preposterous).

Finger Lakes Limited Geography Model
Some Mormon apologists hold that the events of the Book of Mormon occurred in a small region in and around the Finger Lakes region of New York. Part of the basis of this theory lies on statements made by Joseph Smith and other church leaders.See also "Sir, Considering the Liberal Principles," Joseph Smith to N.C. Saxton, editor, American Revivalist, and Rochester Observer, 4 January 1833 (from Times and Seasons [Nauvoo, Illinois] 5 [15 November 1844], 21:705-707) where Smith stated that the "Western Indians" in the United States are the descendants of Book of Mormon peoples.Joseph Smith's published statements indicate that he taught that Book of Mormon peoples or their descendants migrated from "the lake country of America" (near Lake Ontario) to Mexico and Central America. "Traits of the Mosaic History Found Among the Aztaeca Nations", Joseph Smith, Editor, Times and Seasons, June 15, 1842, Volume 3, Number 16, pp 818-820.In his "AMERICAN ANTIQUITIES" editorial of July, 1842, Joseph Smith correlates various archaeological finds in North America, South America, and Central America with events and peoples in the Book of Mormon. See the following Times and Seasons editorials: July 15, 1842, Volume 3, number 18, p. 859-60. "A CATACOMB OF MUMMIES FOUND IN KENTUCKY", Vol. 3, No 13, May 2, 1842, p. 781; "Traits of the Mosaic History, Found Among the Aztaeca Nations", Vol. 3, No 16, June 15, 1842, p. 818; "AMERICAN ANTIQUITIES", Vol. 3, No 18, July 15, 1842, p. 858., "FACTS ARE STUBBORN THINGS.", Times and Seasons, September 15, 1842, Vol. 3, No. 22, p. 922. Note that Smith's authorship of these articles has been challenged on some fronts. However, in the March 15, 1842, edition of the Times and Seasons, editor Joseph Smith informed readers, that he would endorse papers with his signature, or editor's mark "ED". Editor, Times and Seasons, March 15, 1842, Vol. 3, No. 9: "This paper commences my editorial career, I alone stand for it, and shall do for all papers having my signature henceforward. I am not responsible for the publication, or arrangement of the former paper; the matter did not come under my supervision. JOSEPH SMITH.

Mormon apologists believe the archaeological evidence below supports claims that authentic Book of Mormon sites exist in the Finger Lakes region of New York:
Mormon scholar Hugh Nibley drew attention to mound builder works of North America as "an excellent description of Book of Mormon strong places".

South American Limited Geography Model
A document in the handwriting of Frederick G. Williams, one of Joseph Smith's counselors and scribes, asserts that Lehi's people landed in South America at thirty degrees south latitude, which is Coquimbo Bay, Chile.  Analysis of the history and provenance of this document does not indicate it came from Joseph Smith and looks to just be an opinion from an unknown source.

Mormon cultural belief regarding Book of Mormon archaeology

Archaeological evidence of large populations
Mormon scholars have estimated that at various periods in Book of Mormon history, the populations of civilizations discussed in the book ranged between 300,000 and 1.5 million people. The size of the late Jaredite civilization was even larger. According to the Book of Mormon, the final war that destroyed the Jaredites resulted in the deaths of at least two million people.

From Book of Mormon population estimates, it is evident that the civilizations described are comparable in size to the civilizations of ancient Egypt, ancient Greece, ancient Rome, and the Maya. Such civilizations left numerous artifacts in the form of hewn stone ruins, tombs, temples, pyramids, roads, arches, walls, frescos, statues, vases, and coins. The archaeological problem posed by the earth-, timber-, and metal-working societies described in the Book of Mormon was summarized by Hugh Nibley, a prominent BYU professor:

We should not be surprised at the lack of ruins in America in general. Actually the scarcity of identifiable remains in the Old World is even more impressive. In view of the nature of their civilization one should not be puzzled if the Nephites had left us no ruins at all. People underestimate the capacity of things to disappear, and do not realize that the ancients almost never built of stone. Many a great civilization which has left a notable mark in history and literature has left behind not a single recognizable trace of itself. We must stop looking for the wrong things. 

Existing ancient records of the New World
The Smithsonian Institution has noted, "Reports of findings of ancient Egyptian Hebrew, and other Old World writings in the New World in pre-Columbian contexts have frequently appeared in newspapers, magazines, and sensational books. None of these claims has stood up to examination by reputable scholars. No inscriptions using Old World forms of writing have been shown to have occurred in any part of the Americas before 1492 except for a few Norse rune stones which have been found in Greenland."

Losses of ancient writings occurred in the Old World, including as a result of deliberate or accidental fires, wars, earthquakes, and floods. Similar losses occurred in the New World. Much of the literature of the pre-Columbian Maya was destroyed during the Spanish conquest in the 16th century. On this point, Michael Coe noted:

Nonetheless, our knowledge of ancient Maya thought must represent only a tiny fraction of the whole picture, for of the thousands of books in which the full extent of their learning and ritual was recorded, only four have survived to modern times (as though all that posterity knew of ourselves were to be based upon three prayer books and Pilgrim's Progress).

The Maya civilization also left behind a vast corpus of inscriptions (upwards of ten thousand are known) written in the Maya script, the earliest of which date from around the 3rd century BC with the majority written in the Classic Period (c. 250–900 AD). Mayanist scholarship is now able to decipher a large number of these inscriptions. These inscriptions are mainly concerned with the activities of Mayan rulers and the commemoration of significant events, with the oldest known Long Count date corresponding to December 7, 36 BC, being recorded on Chiapa de Corzo Stela 2'' in central Chiapas. None of these inscriptions have been correlated with events, places, or rulers of Book of Mormon.

One Mormon researcher has referred to ancient Mesoamerican accounts that appear to parallel events recorded in the Book of Mormon.

Jaredites and the Olmec

There is no archaeological evidence of the Jaredite people described in the Book of Mormon that is accepted by mainstream archaeologists. Nevertheless, some Mormon scholars believe that the Jaredites were the Olmec civilization, though archaeological evidence supporting this theory is disputed and circumstantial.

The Jaredites of the Book of Mormon are identified as being primarily located in the land northward as opposed to the land southward, however, no information is discussed specific to the Jaredites as to where the dividing line of the land northward and land southward was.

The date at which the Jaredites would be considered a civilization is not identified in the Book of Mormon. The Jaredite civilization in the American covenant land is said to have been completely destroyed as the result of a civil war some time after (as late as 400 BC). Lehi's party is said to have arrived in the New World (approximately 590 BC). Olmec civilization flourished in Mesoamerica during the Preclassic period, dating from 1200 BC to about 400 BC.

Nephites
No Central or South American civilization is recognized by non-LDS scholars to correlate with the Nephites of the Book of Mormon. The Book of Mormon makes no mention of Lamanites or Nephites erecting impressive works of hewn stone as did the Maya or various South American peoples. Some believe that Nephites lived in the Great Lakes region. Numerous aboriginal fortresses of earth and timber were known to have existed in this region.

Military fortifications
There are ten instances in the Book of Mormon in which cities are described as having defensive fortifications. For example, Alma 52:2 describes how the Lamanites "sought protection in their fortifications" in the city of Mulek.

One archaeologist has noted the existence of ancient Mesoamerican defensive fortifications. According to one article in an LDS Church magazine, military fortifying berms are found in the Yucatán Peninsula. Proponents of the Heartland Model have found it ironic that such great lengths would be taken to find "Moroniesque" aboriginal defensive works so far away from Cumorah, when such works are known to have existed in New York.

Efforts to correlate artifacts

Izapa Stela 5

In the early 1950s, M. Wells Jakeman of the BYU Department of Archaeology suggested that a complicated scene carved on Stela 5 in Izapa was a depiction of a Book of Mormon event called "Lehi's dream", which features a vision of the tree of life. This interpretation is disputed by other Mormon and non-Mormon scholars. Julia Guernsey Kappelman, author of a definitive work on Izapan culture, finds that Jakeman's research "belies an obvious religious agenda that ignored Izapa Stela 5's heritage".

Other artifacts
Sorenson claims that one artifact, La Venta Stela 3, depicts a person with Semitic features ("striking beard and beaked nose"). Mormon researchers such as Robin Heyworth have claimed that Copan Stela B depicts elephants; others such as Alfred M Tozzer and Glover M Allen claim it depicts macaws.

See also

Historicity of the Book of Mormon
Biblical archaeology
Criticism of Mormonism
Khirbet Beit Lei
Los Lunas Decalogue Stone
Pre-Columbian trans-oceanic contact
Burrows Cave

Notes

References

.

Further reading
 
 .
 .
 

Mormonism and Native Americans
Book of Mormon studies
Criticism of Mormonism
Mormon apologetics
Book of Mormon
Book of Mormon
Book of Mormon geography